Evans station is an island platformed RTD light rail station in Denver, Colorado, United States. Operating as part of the  D Line, the station was opened on July 14, 2000, and is operated by the Regional Transportation District. It is the northernmost station served exclusively by the D Line. Evans features a public art installation entitled People Hereabouts, created by Jack Unruh and dedicated in 2000.

References

RTD light rail stations in Denver
Railway stations in the United States opened in 2000